Mount Geoffrey Escarpment Provincial Park is a Class-A provincial park in British Columbia, Canada, located on the southwest coast of Hornby Island.

There are facilities for hiking, mountain biking, canoeing, fishing, sightseeing, open water swimming, and horseback riding.

See also
Helliwell Provincial Park
Mount Geoffrey Regional Nature Park
Tribune Bay Provincial Park

References

External links
 Mount Geoffrey Escarpment Provincial Park BC Parks
 

Provincial parks of British Columbia
Provincial Parks of the Gulf Islands
Protected areas established in 2004
2004 establishments in British Columbia